Biomusicology is the study of music from a biological point of view. The term was coined by Nils L. Wallin in 1991 to encompass several branches of music psychology and musicology, including evolutionary musicology, neuromusicology, and comparative musicology.

Evolutionary musicology studies the "origins of music, the question of animal song, selection pressures underlying music evolution", and "music evolution and human evolution". Neuromusicology studies the "brain areas involved in music processing, neural and cognitive processes of musical processing", and "ontogeny of musical capacity and musical skill". Comparative musicology studies the "functions and uses of music, advantages and costs of music making", and "universal features of musical systems and musical behavior".

Applied biomusicology "attempts to provide biological insight into such things as the therapeutic uses of music in medical and psychological treatment; widespread use of music in the audiovisual media such as film and television; the ubiquitous presence of music in public places and its role in influencing mass behavior; and the potential use of music to function as a general enhancer of learning."

Whereas biomusicology refers to music among humans, zoomusicology extends the field to other species.

See also

 Biogenetic structuralism
 Biolinguistics
 Biophony
 Bird song
 Chronobiology
 Cognitive musicology
 Cognitive neuroscience of music
 Culture in music cognition
 Entrainment (biomusicology)
 Evolutionary musicology
 Music psychology
 Music therapy
 Psychoacoustics
 Sociocultural evolution
 Zoomusicology

References

Further reading
 Arom, Simha (1999): "Prolegomena to a Biomusicology." In: Nils L. Wallin/Björn Merker/Steven Brown (Eds.), The origins of music, Cambridge, Massachusetts: MIT Press, pp. 27–29.
 Darwin, Charles (1871): The Descent of Man and Selection in Relation to Sex. John Murray: London.
 Fitch, W. Tecumseh (2006): "The biology and evolution of music: a comparative perspective". Cognition, 100(1), pp. 173–215.
 Hauser, Marc D./Josh McDermott  (2003): "The evolution of the music faculty: a comparative perspective." In: Nature Neuroscience Vol. 6, No. 7, pp. 663–668.
 Peretz, Isabelle (2006): "The nature of music from a biological perspective." Cognition 100 (2006), pp. 1–32.
 Wallin, Nils L./Björn Merker/Steven Brown (Eds., 1999): The Origins of Music, Cambridge, Massachusetts: MIT Press. .
 Zatorre, R./Peretz, I. (2000): The Biological Foundations of Music, New York: National Academy Press.

Cognitive neuroscience
Music cognition
Music psychology
Cognitive musicology